Telomestatin is a macrocyclic chemical compound that acts by inhibiting the telomerase activity of in vitro cancer cells. It was first isolated from the bacteria Streptomyces anulatus.  Telomestatin induces the formation of basket-type G-quadruplex (G4) structures from hybrid-type G-quadruplexes in the telomeric region. Upon formation of G4 structure there will be a decrease in the activity of the telomerase, which is involved in the replication of the telomeres and as a result the cell dies due to Hayflick type senescence.

References

Macrocycles
Oxazoles
Thiazolines
Telomeres